Eucalyptus exigua is a species of mallee that is endemic to Western Australia. It has smooth, whitish bark, linear to narrow lance-shaped adult leaves, flower buds in groups of between seven and eleven, white flowers and short barrel-shaped to conical fruit.

Description
It has smooth, white to grey bark on the trunk and branches. Flowering occurs in March and the flowers are white.

Taxonomy
Eucalyptus exigua was first formally described in 1993 by the botanists Ian Brooker and Stephen Hopper in the journal Nuytsia from a specimen collected by Brooker near the road between Hyden and Norseman. The specific epithet (exigua) is from the Latin word exiguus meaning "small" or "feeble", referring to the habit of this species compared to the similar Eucalyptus brachycorys.

Eucalyptus exigua is part of the subgenus Symphyomyrtus section Dumaria in a sub-group of nine closely related species called series Ovulares. The smooth-barked members of this series include E. exigua, E. cyclostoma, E. cylindrocarpa and E. oraria and rough-barked members include E. ovularis, E. aequioperta, E. brachycorys, E. myriadena and E. baudiniana.

Distribution and habitat
This mallee is found on sandplains mainly east of Hyden in the Wheatbelt and Goldfields-Esperance regions of Western Australia, where it grows in sandy loamy soils.

Conservation status
This eucalypt is classified as "Priority Three" by the Western Australian Government Department of Parks and Wildlife meaning that it is poorly known and known from only a few locations but is not under imminent threat.

See also
List of Eucalyptus species

References

exigua
Endemic flora of Western Australia
Mallees (habit)
Myrtales of Australia
Eucalypts of Western Australia
Vulnerable flora of Australia
Plants described in 1993
Taxa named by Ian Brooker